Roderick John "Bobby" Wallace (November 4, 1873 – November 3, 1960) was a Major League Baseball infielder, pitcher, manager, umpire, and scout. Wallace claimed to have invented the continuous throwing motion as a shortstop.

Career
Wallace was born in Pittsburgh, Pennsylvania. In , Wallace was an everyday player as he became the team's full-time third baseman, batted .335 and drove in 112 runs.

In , Wallace moved to the St. Louis Perfectos (renamed the Cardinals in ) and changed position to shortstop. He hit .295 with 108 RBI and 12 home runs (second in the league behind Buck Freeman's 25).

In July , he returned to the National League and the Cardinals, and played in just eight games that season. He played his last game on September 2, 1918, at the age of 44 years and 312 days, making him the oldest shortstop to play in a regular-season game. The record was broken by Omar Vizquel on May 7, 2012.

Wallace was generally recognized as the AL's best shortstop from 1902 to 1911, when he served briefly as Browns player-manager. After moving from third to short, Wallace felt he'd found his place in the infield earning the nickname "Mr. Shortstop". He would also claim to have invented the continuous throwing motion, “As more speed afoot was constantly demanded for big league ball, I noticed the many infield bounders which the runner beat to first only by the thinnest fractions of a second.. I also noted that the old-time three-phase movement, fielding a ball, coming erect for a toss and throwing to first wouldn’t do on certain hits with fast men…it was plain that the stop and toss had to be combined into a continuous movement.”

He played for 25 seasons, and holds the record for the longest career by a player who never played in a World Series.

When his playing time diminished, Wallace managed and umpired. He compiled 62 wins and 154 losses for a .287 winning percentage as a major league manager. He umpired in the American League in 1915, working 111 games. Upon retiring, he also became a scout.

Later life

Wallace died on November 3, 1960, in Torrance, California, one day shy of his 87th birthday.

Managerial record

See also
List of Major League Baseball career hits leaders
List of Major League Baseball career triples leaders
List of Major League Baseball career runs scored leaders
List of Major League Baseball career runs batted in leaders
List of Major League Baseball career stolen bases leaders
List of Major League Baseball career games played leaders
List of Major League Baseball player-managers

References

External links

Retrosheet.org
The Deadball Era
 

1873 births
1960 deaths
19th-century baseball players
Baseball players from Pittsburgh
Burials at Inglewood Park Cemetery
Chicago Cubs scouts
Cincinnati Reds coaches
Cincinnati Reds managers
Cincinnati Reds scouts
Cleveland Spiders players
Major League Baseball player-managers
Major League Baseball shortstops
Major League Baseball third basemen
Major League Baseball umpires
Minor league baseball managers
Muskogee Mets players
National Baseball Hall of Fame inductees
St. Louis Browns managers
St. Louis Browns players
St. Louis Cardinals players
St. Louis Perfectos players
Sportspeople from Pittsburgh
Wichita Witches players